Skövde AIK is a Swedish football club from Skövde. It was founded on 21 June 1919. The club is currently in Superettan.

Background
Skövde AIK has played 14 seasons in second tier Swedish football, the last time being as recently as 1995 in the Division 1 Södra.  Eight seasons later the club had plunged into Division 5 Västergötland Östra, the sixth tier, having been relegated 3 consecutive times between 2000 and 2002. However SAIK have made a dramatic recovery and by 2007 were back in Division 1 Södra which is now the third tier of Swedish football after 4 consecutive promotions. In 2006, Skövde AIK won the Division 2 Mellersta Götaland after defeating IK Sleipner 2–1 in the decisive final match before 2364 spectators.  In 2009 the club just failed to get into the Superettan after missing out in the Promotion Playoffs.

The club is affiliated to the Västergötlands Fotbollförbund.

Season to season

Current squad

Attendances

In recent seasons Skövde AIK have had the following average attendances:

Achievements

League
 Division 1 Södra:
 Runners-up (1): 2009

Managers
 Gunnar Reis (1958–59)
 Sven "Fiskarn" Johansson (1960–1961)
 Lars Daremark (1962)
 C-G Bolander (1963)
 Arne Selmosson (1964–68)
 Lars Arnesson (1969)
 Axel "Acke" Eriksson (1970)
 Carl-Axel "CAS" Stenberg (1971–72)
 Janne Carlsson (1973–74)
 Blagoja Vucidolov (1975)
 Carl-Axel "CAS" Stenberg (1976–77)
 Ove Wigertz (1978)
 Sven - Eric "Svenne" Johansson (1979–80)
 Christer Fermvik (1981–83)
 Thom Åhlund (1984–86)
 Teitur Thordarson (1987)
 Inge Lennartsson (1988–89)
 Christer Swärd (1990–94)
 Stefan Johansson (1995–96)
 Francisco Verona (1997)
 Gary Wright (1998)
 Bengt Persson (1998)
 Francisco Verona (1999–2000)
 Magnus Henriksson (2001–02)
 Gudmundur Magnusson (2003–07)
 Stefan Jacobsson (2008–11)
 Rickard Söderberg (2012–2013)
 Charbel Abraham (2013)
 Mikael Thorvald (2018)
 Stefan Strind (2019–2020)
 Mikael Lindgren (2020)
 Tobias Linderoth (2021–)

Futsal
The club also has a futsal team who has won SM-guld the previous 5 years.

Honours
5 Futsal Championship: 2005, 2006, 2007, 2008, 2009

External links
Skövde AIK Official Website

Footnotes

 
Association football clubs established in 1919
Football clubs in Västra Götaland County
Futsal clubs in Sweden
1919 establishments in Sweden
Sport in Skövde